John F. Miller may refer to:

 John Franklin Miller (senator) (1831–1886), U.S. Senator from California
 John Franklin Miller (representative) (1862–1936), U.S Representative from Washington, mayor of Seattle
 John F. Miller (Ann Arbor mayor), served 1861–1862, see List of mayors of Ann Arbor, Michigan
 John F. Miller (American football)
 John F. Miller (Oregon politician), member of the Oregon Territorial Legislature, 1853
 John F. Miller (Texas politician), see Texas Senate, District 14
 John F. Miller (artist), b. 1927

See also
John Miller (disambiguation)